Curt Wachsmuth (27 April 1837, Naumburg an der Saale – 8 June 1905, Leipzig) was a German historian and classical philologist. He was a son-in-law to philologist Friedrich Ritschl.

Academic biography 
From 1856 to 1860 he studied at the universities of Jena and Bonn, where he later received his habilitation in classical philology and ancient history. In 1864 he became a professor in ancient history at the University of Marburg, followed by professorships in classical philology at the universities of Göttingen (1869–1877) and Heidelberg (1877–1885). From 1885 to 1905 he was a professor of classical philology and ancient history at the University of Leipzig. In 1897/98 he served as university rector.

Published works 
Among his better written efforts were a two volume work on ancient Athens (1874, 1890), an introduction to the study of ancient history (1895) and with Otto Hense, a five volume edition of Stobaeus' Anthologium. 
 De Cratete Mallota disputavit adiectis eius reliquiis, Leipzig 1860 (S. 1-36 appeared as dissertation)
 Die Stadt Athen im Altertum, 2 volumes, Leipzig 1874, 1890 – The city of Athens in antiquity
 Studien zu den griechischen Florilegien, 1882 – Studies of Greek florilegia
 Ioannis Stobaei Anthologium (with Otto Hense), 5 volumes. 1884–1912 – edition of Stobaeus
 Sillographorum Graecorum reliquiae. Praecedit commentatio de Timone Phliasio ceterisque sillographis, Leipzig 1885
 Neue Beiträge zur Topographie von Athen, 1887 – New contributions on the topography of Athens
 Einleitung in das Studium der alten Geschichte, Leipzig 1895 – Introduction to the study of ancient history
 Ioannis Laurentii Lydi Liber de Ostentis et Calendaria graeca omnia, 1897 – edition of John the Lydian

References 

1837 births
1905 deaths
German antiquarians
German classical philologists
19th-century German historians
University of Jena alumni
University of Bonn alumni
Academic staff of the University of Marburg
Academic staff of Leipzig University
Rectors of Leipzig University
Academic staff of Heidelberg University
Academic staff of the University of Göttingen
People from Naumburg (Saale)